Wilhelm Guttmann (1 January 1886 – 8 February 1941) was a German composer. His work was part of the music event in the art competition at the 1932 Summer Olympics.

References

Further reading
 Paul Frank: Kurzgefasstes Tonkünstler-Lexikon. 12th edition. Leipzig 1926, p. 498
 Martin Goldsmith: The Inextinguishable Symphony: A True Story of Music and Love in Nazi Germany. New York 2000, p. 264
 Erich H. Müller: Deutsches Musikerlexikon. Dresden 1929, p. 538
 Theo Stengel: Lexikon der Juden in der Musik. Berlin 1940, p. 485
 Karl-Josef Kutsch, Leo Riemens: Großes Sängerlexikon. 4th edition, vol. 3. München 2004
 Deutsche Biographische Enzyklopädie. 2nd edition, vol. 4. München 2006, p. 288
 Ludwig van Beethoven, 9. Sinfonie. Oskar Fried, dir. Nachdruck 2011, Pristine PASC 317
 Rainer E. Lotz, Axel Weggen and Christian Zwarg: Discographie der deutschen Gesangsaufnahmen, vol. 3, Birgit Lotz Verlag, Bonn 2001 
 Paul Thoben: Victoria Prinzessin zu Bentheim und Steinfurt und ihre lebensrettende Hilfe für die jüdische Familie Guttmann in: Emsländische Geschichte 28, hrsg. von der Studiengesellschaft für Emsländische Regionalgeschichte, Meppen 2021, p. 381–421

1886 births
1941 deaths
German male composers
Olympic competitors in art competitions
People from Berlin
20th-century German male musicians